"Fallen" is a song by the British DJ Paul Masterson, also known as Yomanda, and the British rock singer Toyah Willcox, released independently in 2011.

Background
The track started life as an instrumental piece by Masterson, who sent it to Toyah and asked if she would record a vocal for it. In an interview on Gaydar Radio, he said that they "hadn't actually met until the day of recording the vocals. We spoke on email and we recorded the vocals down at Dave Pemberton's studio in Essex. (...) It took about three hours and all done, pretty much, in one take." "Fallen" was released as a standalone digital single in September 2011. In 2020, it appeared as a bonus track on Toyah's retrospective box set Toyah Solo.

Music video
The song's music video was directed and edited by Simon Booth and Dean Stockings.

Track listing
 Digital single

Personnel
 Toyah Willcox – vocals
 Paul "Yomanda" Masterson – all instruments, producing, mixing

References

2011 singles
2011 songs
British electronic dance music songs
Toyah Willcox songs
Songs written by Toyah Willcox